Ypsolopha amoenella is a moth of the family Ypsolophidae. It is known from Japan, Korea, north-eastern China and Russia.

The wingspan is 18–20 mm.

The larvae feed on Acer mono.

References

Ypsolophidae
Moths of Asia